Tegula pellisserpentis, common name the serpent-tongue tegula, is a species of sea snail, a marine gastropod mollusk in the family Tegulidae.

Description
The size of the shell varies between 15 mm and 45 mm. The very thick, solid and heavy, imperforate shell has a conical and elevated shape. Its color is yellowish or pinkish, marked with narrow angular patches or interrupted longitudinal oblique stripes of black. The spire is strictly conical. The apex is acute. The sutures are linear. The eight whorls are encircled by weakly granose lirae, separated by narrow impressed lines. The periphery is nearly smooth. The base of the shell is smooth or lirate, and eroded in front of the oblique aperture. The outer lip is thick within, smooth, bevelled to an edge. The oblique columella bears in the middle a heavy tubercle, and is at the base less prominently toothed.

Distribution
This species occurs in the Pacific Ocean from El Salvador to Colombia.

References

External links
 To Encyclopedia of Life
 To World Register of Marine Species
 

pellisserpentis
Gastropods described in 1828